Dasun Pathirana (born 26 July 1985, as දසුන් පතිරණ) [Sinhala]), is a model and an award-winning actor in Sri Lankan cinema, theater and television. He won an award at Indie Fest 2014 as best actor in a leading role. He received his first Sarasaviya award in 2018.

Personal life 
Pathirana was born on born 26 July 1985 and studied in Carey College, Colombo. He studied drama and acting under Mahendra Perea's academy of acting and drama. He had one younger sister, Deshani who was born in 1996.

Dasun's partner is Nadeesha Hansi Dissanayake and their love story had been a secret to the media for four years. The two has two daughters, Shaiya Lily Pathirana, born in 2018 and Shaya Lily Pathirana , born in 2019

Career
Pathirana started his career in 2002 at the age of 17. In 2004, Pathirana entered Mahendra Perera’s Academy for Acting and Drama.

He performed in many Sri Lankan teledramas, films, commercials, stage dramas and music videos. He received a Best Upcoming Actor award for his role in the teledrama Ahasin Watuna.

In 2014, he was the lead in the film Frangipani, which screened at Tasveer, the ninth Annual Seattle South Asian Film Festival and at the BFI Flare LGBT Film Festival. His acting received positive reviews.

In 2015, he played the lead in Motor Bicycle, which won best film and best direction awards at the SAARC Film Festival. The film also won the "Cinema of tomorrow" award at the Derana Film Award Ceremony in year 2015.

He received the best actor award in Derana sunsilk cinema Awards 2017 for his role "Kasun" in movie Sayapethi Kusuma. He performed in many music videos and won the best actor in a video award in Derana music award ceremony  in 2016.

Television serials

 Ado 
 A/L Iwarai
 Giridevi
 Mage Adara Awanaduwa
 Massa 
 Maya Patala
 Mega
 Parisiyata Paara Kiyana
 Pini Bindu
 Sanda Vinivida
 Sath Piyawaru
 Star Sri Lanka Histhanak
 Thanamalvila Kollek 
 Thaththa
 Thriloka
 Thumpane

Filmography

Awards and accolades
He has won several awards at the local stage drama, cinema and television festivals.

Indie Fest

|-
|| 2014 ||| Performance in Drama || Best Actor ||

Derana Film Awards

|-
|| 2017 ||| Sayapethi Kusuma || Best Actor ||

Signis Film Awards

|-
|| 2017 ||| Motor Bicycle || Best Actor ||

SAARC Film Festival

|-
|| 2017 ||| Motor Bicycle || Best Actor ||

Sarasaviya Awards

|-
|| 2016 ||| Motor Bicycle || Best Actor ||

Hiru Golden Film Awards

|-
|| 2018 ||| Motor Bicycle || Best Actor ||

Raigam Tele'es

|-
||2013||| Ahasin Watuna || Best Actor ||

Sumathi Awards

|-
|| 2019 ||| Thaththa || Best Supporting Actor ||

References

External links

 Hansi Dissanayake about her husband
 Gossip Chat With Dasun Pathirana

1985 births
Living people
Alumni of Carey College, Colombo
Sri Lankan male film actors
Sinhalese male actors